Morrisonia triangula is a moth of the family Noctuidae. It is found in the south-eastern United States.

Name 
Morrisonia triangula Sullivan & Adam, 2009

Type locality: USA, North Carolina, Craven Co., Croatan National Forest, Road 169.

Holotype: USNM. male. 2.IV.2000. J.B. Sullivan.

References

External links
Image

Hadeninae